The Mbarizunga Game Reserve is found in South Sudan. It was established in 1939. Chimpanzees were thought to occur at this site; however, there is no recent information on the occurrence of chimpanzees at this site (Department of Wildlife Management 1982). The tropical forest habitat features key species of Bongo, bushbuck, and Yellow-backed Duiker.

References

 Department of Wildlife Management (1982) Wildlife Information Booklet. Democratic Republic of the Sudan, Ministry of Wildlife Conservation and Tourism, Southern Region. Cited in: Lee, P.C., Thornback, J., Bennett, E.L. (1988) Threatened Primates of Africa. The IUCN Red Data Book. IUCN, Gland, Switzerland and Cambridge, UK.

Game reserves of South Sudan